A Hungry Heart is a 1917 silent film drama directed by Emile Chautard and starring Alice Brady. It was produced and distributed by World Film Corporation. It is sometimes called The Hungry Heart but shouldn't be confused with the Pauline Frederick film of the same year.

The film is now lost.

Cast
 Alice Brady - Frou Frou
 Edward Langford - Comte Paul de Valreas
 George MacQuarrie - Marquis Henri de Sartorys
 Gerda Holmes - Louise Brigard
 Alec B. Francis - M. Brigard
 John Dudley - Baron de Combri
 Edna Whistler - Baronne de Combri
 Charles Harley - Pitou
 Josephine Earle - Pauline
 Horace Haine - Gaston
 Ray Carrara - Georgie de Sartorys
 Mathilde Brundage - Mother of Comte de Valreas

See also
The Toy Wife (1938)

References

External links
  A Hungry Heart at IMDb.com
 

1917 films
American silent feature films
American films based on plays
Films directed by Emile Chautard
Lost American films
American black-and-white films
World Film Company films
Silent American drama films
1917 drama films
Films about sisters
1917 lost films
Lost drama films
1910s American films
1910s English-language films